Fenerbahçe S.K. U21, commonly known as Fenerbahçe S.K. B is a football club based in Istanbul, Turkey. It is the reserve team of Fenerbahçe S.K. and the club play in the U21 Ligi.

Honours

Players

Current squad

References

External links
 

Football
A2
Football clubs in Istanbul
Sport in Kadıköy
A2 Ligi clubs